Bienvenido Munoz Noriega Jr. (1952-1994) is a Philippine playwright.

He is the second child of Bienvenido Noriega and Socorro Munoz of Cauayan, Isabela and Cabatuan, Isabela, respectively.  He finished his secondary education at St. Anthony School, Singalong, Malate (Salutatorian, 1968), and his tertiary education at the University of the Philippines (A.B. Economics, cum laude and Valedictorian of the class, 1971 and M.A. Economics, 1973). He continued his postgraduate studies at Harvard University (Master in Public Administration, 1979; "A" student) and at Columbia University]] (Executive Program in Business Administration, 1983).  At the University of the Philippines, Harvard University and Massachusetts Institute of Technology, he took up courses such as Modern Drama, Shakespeare, Comedy and Film Theory.

He worked for the Philippine government for more than twenty years (most of them were at the  National Economic and Development Authority as Director, Policy Coordination Staff and Philippine National Bank, as Executive Vice President, Corporate Services). He taught part-time at  U.P. Diliman and U.P. Manila, Ateneo, La Salle, Assumption, and U.E. Noriega worked for Experimental Cinema of the Philippines]], Tanghalang Pilipino]] and was co-founder of Dramatis personæ. And even before he succumbed to cancer in 1994, Noriega was Executive Vice President at a large bank in Makati, Philippines.

Summary of notable accomplishments 
Overview

Bienvenido M. Noriega Jr. received posthumously two national honors. One was the Tanglaw ng Lahi award for Theater from the Ateneo de Manila University in 1995. The second was the prestigious Centennial Honors for the Arts in Theater from the Cultural Center of the Philippines and Philippine Centennial Commission in 1999.
Prior to succumbing to cancer in 1994 at the young age of 42, Noriega was recipient of more than 22 major awards for writing – six from the Cultural Center of the Philippines, thirteen from the Carlos Palanca Memorial Awards for Literature, one each from Philippine Educational Theater Association (PETA), Experimental Cinema of the Philippines (ECP) and Palihang Aurelio Tolentino. He also received four National Book Awards from the Manila Critics Circle. 
His award-winning works have been frequently staged by both professional and student theater companies in the country and in the US, Canada, UK. Athens, Geneva, Paris and as far as Qatar. He directed a lot of his plays and even delved in musicales writing the libretto for "Kenkoy loves Rosing" and "Bituing Marikit" and wrote the song lyrics of "Tuldukan na'ng hapis" for Basil Valdez.

Resume

Born in Cauayan, Isabela, Noriega's native dialects were Ilocano and Ibanag, but he picked up on Tagalog and English through rental of Tagalog and Marvel comics. He finished elementary school at St. Ferdinand College in Ilagan, Isabela, and high school at St. Anthony School in Singalong, Manila.
He completed A.B. Economics at the University of the Philippines within 3 years at the age of 18. After graduating cum laude and valedictorian of class of 1971, he went on to earn his M.A. Economics at the same university, again graduating as class valedictorian in 1973. 
He was college councilor and the Philippinensian yearbook editor. He wrote his first play Down the Basement in 1970 after attending a playwriting course at the University of the Philippines, which was eventually published in the Philippine Collegian Folio.
He was sent to the Kennedy School of Harvard University in 1979 for a master's degree in Public Administration (MPA). He graduated at the top of his Edward S. Mason Fellows class with straight A's. He then went for further studies in Columbia University for his Executive Program in Business Administration, finishing in 1983. 
And while he was in those universities, he took up courses such as Modern Drama, Shakespeare, Comedy and Film Theory.
He worked for the Philippine government for more than twenty years. He was the youngest NEDA Director at 23 when he managed the Policy and Coordination Staff of the National Economic and Development Authority (NEDA) from 1971 to 1981. 
He was likewise the youngest to be appointed as Executive Vice President, Corporate Services at the Philippine National Bank, from 1981 to 1993. There he also served as president of PNB Investments Ltd and a director of PNB Securities Inc.
He taught part-time in U.P. Diliman and U.P. Manila, Ateneo, La Salle, Assumption, and U.E.  [Ateneo is now considering to also nominate Noriega for the National Artist award.] He also worked for Experimental Cinema of the Philippines and for Tanghalang Pilipino and was co-founder of Dramatis Personae.

Some Awards and Citations

In conferring the Tanglaw ng Lahi award to Noriega in 1995, Ateneo De Manila stated that:
"The significance of Noriega's achievement in Theater and Film will be impoverished unless it is put in place with his career in banking and government service. Here one does not find the simple case of competition between work and avocation or between two careers or even loves. Noriega was expert in his two occupations – as writer and technocrat and he managed to put them together in his person.
"Noriega has put form to the Filipino's search for a sense of place in these works. His characters often find themselves out of place--literally and in every aspect. In probably his most popular play, Bayan-bayanan, they are Philippine Embassy staff, government employees training abroad, overseas contract workers, and other Filipino travelers exiled in Geneva.
"There each of them has to contend with not only the bitter cold but also their individual fates and the usual situation of the exile, and their different responses to this plight are what Noriega is able to masterfully orchestrate.
"Poverty makes Ramona Reyes, a household help in the play bearing her name, out of place in Forbes Park where she works. Ironically, going abroad as a domestic helper appears to her as her only escape. The myriad forms of exile are more directly depicted in Takas, a play about friendship between a Vietnamese refugee who comes to shore and the Filipino boy whose family takes in the stranger. In no time, the boy discovers that he too is a stranger in his own country.
"Batang Pro, a controversial work about child prostitution, portrays the tragedy of children pushed out of their very childhood by dehumanizing destitution, while the film Soltero shows the anguish of an aging single male in a culture centered on family.
"By presenting characters who are out of place and at the same time, refusing an easy way out for their dilemma, Noriega ennobles the plight and struggle of the Filipino. He takes an insider's point of view to depict outsiders' lives, and thus is able to confront, even satirize, every facet of Filipino life without despair nor disdain. The Filipino family takes center stage in Ang Mga Propesyonal and Kasalan sa Likod ng Simbahan, romance in Kenkoy Loves Rosing and W.I.S. (Walang Ibig Sabihin) and politics in Bongbong at Kris."
" It would be a mistake to think that Noriega's sole achievement lies in having given voice to what every Filipino feels. His writing broke new artistic ground because the voices of his characters were neither the hysterical sobs of traditional Filipino melodrama nor the rhetorical protest of propaganda pieces. He wrote plays of differing structures and styles. Some are one-acters, others full-length. In a few, the influence of Chekhov appears; in others, that of the expressionists. 
"The role that music played changed from play to play. This creative freedom, far from simple experimentation, was based on his insight into the dynamics of insider and outsider; it enabled him to use styles and techniques wherever he found them without being afraid of being derivative. He always knew where he was writing from."
In her book review in 1988, Doreen Fernandez wrote:
"Noriega's skill is especially evident in the dialogue, which reproduces many different levels of colloquial Filipino (the college girl type, the movie/television gay variants, the almostformal etc.), the editions of code-switching, and the variations proper to each character. The writer's ear is true and his comic hand sure.
"Bongbong at Kris which won a prize in the 1987 Cultural Center of the Philippines Playwriting contest, was one of the first plays written and staged after the end of the Marcos regime. This was a time when the playwrights who had written veiled and direct protest plays in the previous two decades were reassessing the matter for drama after the end of a period of unspoken but real censorship and suppression…
"Sana'y maaliw tayo", Noriega ends, and indeed the play amuses and entertains. It is welcome comedy, since not too many contemporary playwrights - and indeed comparatively few in the history of Philippine drama - have devoted their talents to the comic genre. And it is welcome laughter, since it comments lightly but pointedly on the world of "pelikula't politika" – on the mores and manners, on the pulsing and possible lives within Philippine media and politics."
Jose Dalisay wrote in his article " A writer's Baul" in Philstar.com, September 9, 2005:
"He was, to my mind, the best playwright we ever produced, bar none. His sense of the dramatic tended toward the deep, regretful sadness of foregone happiness and missed opportunities rather than riotous excess."
Dean Rogelio Sicat, UP in his book review of Deuterium in 1995 wrote:
"I have observed the Philippine literary scene for over three decades as a practicing writer, a U.P. professor. Literary historian and critic, and as juror in all of the country's most prestigious literary contests including the Carlos Palanca Awards for Literature (eight times), and the CCP. 
"Without any reservation, I consider Bienvenido M. Noriega, Jr. as the best Filipino playwright today as evidenced by his output, books published, national awards, stagings in prestigious venues (including presentations abroad) and consistent recognition by peers and critics.
"In Noriega, Filipino playwriting finally hurdled being tentative to become the fullblown and lively genre that it is now. He broke new ground between stereotyped tradition-bound Tagalog plays. The dominant playwright from the seventies to the present, Noriega who writes in everyday Filipino has a wide-ranging repertoire , from the personal to the social, from the comic to the tragic."
His award in 1999 for Centennial Honors for the Arts (in Theater) read:
"Ang mga dula ni Bienvenido Noriega Jr.,mandudula ay kilala para sa kakaibang di-hayagang komentaryo sa masalimuot at nagtutunggaling pagpapahalaga't identidad na Filipino. Bagama't ang kanyang mga dula ay sumasaklaw sa tila malawakang isyu, nakikipag-usap ang mga ito sa mga kontemporanyong panlipunang problema. Ang laging nakataya sa kanyang mga dula ay ang isyu ng indibidwal at komunidad bilang analogo ng pambansang identidad…."
"Binigyang giya ni Noriega ang modernong Filipinong dulaan tungo sa natatangi at sensitibong apila sa mga isyu ng personal at pambansang identidad.
"Para sa kanyang malawak at patuloy na pagtatangka sa paglalahad ng Filipinong identidad sa kanyang dula, madalas ay Kritikal sa mga institusyunal na kalakaran at nagsusumamo sa humastikong ideal na nagpapakilos tungo sa tinatanaw na egalitaryang kaayusanan, ang Parangal Sentenyal sa Sining at Kultura ay ginagawad ngayong ika-2 ng Pebrero 1999 kay Bienvenido Noriega Jr."

Creative works 
His famous plays are Bayan-Bayanan, Ramona Reyes ng Forbes Park, Kanluran ng Buhay, Ang Mga Propesyonal, W.I.S (Walang Ibang Sabihin), Takas, Regina Ramos ng Greenwich Village, Kenkoy loves Rosing, Naikwento Lang Sa Akin, Juan Luna, Barkada, Kasalan sa Likod ng Simbahan, Batang Pro, and Bongbong at Kris.

Awards

National Honors
 1995 Tanglaw ng Lahi Award in Theater (Posthumous), Ateneo de Manila
 1999 Centennial Honors for the Arts (Theater), Cultural Center of the Philippines and Philippine Centennial Commission

Cultural Center of the Philippines Awards
 1975 Full Length Play Grand Prize Winner, "Bayan-bayanan"
 1976 Full Length Play, Second Prize, "Ramona Reyes ng Forbes Park"
 1976 Full Length Play Special Prize, " Kasalan sa Likod ng Simbahan"
 1980 Full Length Play Third Prize, "W.I.S. (Walang Ibig Sabihin)"
 1980 Full Length Play Special Prize, "Takas"
 1986 Full Length Play Third Prize "Bongbong at Kris"

Palanca Awards
 1975: One Act Play in Filipino, Special Prize: "Kulay Rosas na Mura ang isang Pangarap"
 1976: Full length Play in Filipino, Special Prize: "Ang Artista sa Palengke"
 1977: One Act Play in Filipino, Third Prize: "Kanluran ng Buhay"
 1977: Full length Play in Filipino, Third Prize: "Talambuhay"
 1978: Full length Play in Filipino, Third Prize: "Ang mga Propesyonal"
 1981: Full length Play in Filipino, First Prize: "Mga Idolong Romantiko sa Isang Dulang Sumusuri ng Lipunan"
 1981: Full-length Play in Filipino, Second Prize: "Juan Luna"
 1981: One Act Play in Filipino, Second Prize: "Barkada" 
 1983: Full-length Play in Filipino, Second Prize: "Batang Pro"
 1985: Full length Play in Filipino, Second Prize: "Pansamantalang Dilim"
 1986: Full-length Play in Filipino, First Prize: "Bayan Mo"
 1990: One Act Play in Filipino, Third prize: "Naikwento Lang Sa Akin" 
 1990: Full-length Play in Filipino, First Prize: "Deuterium

PETA
 1973: Full Length Play, Second Prize: Tinangay si Napsa, Tinangay si Napsa"

Palihang Aurelio V. Tolentino
 1980: One Act Play, Winner: "Lilipad pag Pinalad"

Musicales
 Kenkoy loves Rosing (Libretto)
 Bituing Marikit (Libretto)

Film Screenplays
 Soltero, Experimental Cinema of the Philippines awardee
 Batang Pro

Manila Critics Circle, National Book Awards
 "Bayan-bayanan at Iba pang Dula" (1982)
 "Pares-pares" (1983)
 "Soltero", screenplay (1985)
 "Deuterium/Mga Idolong Romantiko" (1995)

Song Lyrics
 "Tuldukan na'ng Hapis", Basil Valdez (1983)

References 

1952 births
1994 deaths
University of the Philippines alumni
Harvard Kennedy School alumni
Columbia Business School alumni
People from Isabela (province)